A Luz e a Escuridão is the seventh album by the Portuguese music composer António Pinho Vargas. It was released in 1996.

Track listing

António Pinho Vargas albums
1996 albums